Ian Derek Marchant (born 9 February 1961) is an English accountant and businessman. He was the chief executive officer of Scottish and Southern Energy (SSE plc) from 2002 until he left the position as of 30 June 2013.

Early life
He attended the independent Trinity School of John Whitgift. Afterwards he studied at Durham University, as a member of Hatfield College, gaining a 2:1 in Economics in 1983.

Career
He was an accountant for PricewaterhouseCoopers from 1983-92. In 1992, he joined Southern Electric, which became Scottish and Southern Energy in 1998.

Marchant received an Honorary Doctorate from Heriot-Watt University in 2009

Scottish and Southern Energy
He became CEO of SSE in 2002 when aged 41. SSE had about 9.5 million electricity and gas customers.

References

External links
SSE

News items
Scotsman November 2008
The Times August 2008

SSE plc
English chief executives
1961 births
People educated at Trinity School of John Whitgift
People from Croydon
Alumni of Hatfield College, Durham
Living people
English accountants